Shuangpai County is a county in Hunan Province, China, it is under the administration of the prefecture-level city of Yongzhou. Shuangpai is also the 3rd smallest administrative unit (after Shaoshan and Guzhang)  by population in the counties and county-level cities of the province.

Located on the southern margin of the province, it is adjacent to the city proper of Yongzhou, and lies to the eastern border of Guangxi. The county is bordered to the north and the northwest by Lingling District, to the east and the southeast by Ningyuan County, to the southwest and the south by Dao County, Quanzhou County of Guangxi. The county has 6 towns and 5 townships under its jurisdiction, the county seat is Shuangpo.

Administrative divisions
6 towns
 Chalin
 Hejiadong
 Jiangcun
 Majiang
 Shuangbo
 Wulipai

4 townships
 Daguping
 Lijiaping
 Tangdi
 Wuxingling

1 Yao ethnic township
 Shangwujiang

Climate

References
www.xzqh.org

External links 

Shuangpai
County-level divisions of Hunan
Yongzhou